Andrew George Proudlove (15 January 1955 – 25 September 2017) was an English former footballer. A winger, he played for Reading, Buxton, Sheffield Wednesday, Norwich City, Hereford United, Port Vale, Stafford Rangers, Macclesfield Town, Matlock Town, and KuPS. He won the Cheshire County League title with Buxton in 1972–73.

Career
Proudlove began his career with Reading, making five Fourth Division appearances in the 1971–72 season. His stay at Elm Park was brief, and he left the "Royals" and joined Buxton. The "Bucks" won the Cheshire County League in 1972–73, and won admission to the Northern Premier League. He briefly signed for Mossley in September 1972, making ten appearances before returning to Buxton two months later. Buxton finished 18th in 1973–74 and 16th in 1974–75. He returned to the Football League with Len Ashurst's Sheffield Wednesday, making 15 Third Division appearances in the 1975–76 season. He left Hillsborough for Norwich City, but played just one First Division game in the 1976–77 campaign for John Bond's "Canaries". He moved from Carrow Road to Hereford United, but played just 11 league games at the "Bulls" were relegated out of the Third Division. He returned to Buxton after leaving Edgar Street. He signed with Dennis Butler's Port Vale from Buxton for a £1,000 fee in November 1978. He played five consecutive Fourth Division games for the club around January 1979, but did not solve Vale's troubles on the left side of midfield and was instead given a free transfer to Alliance Premier League side Stafford Rangers in May 1979. He later played for Macclesfield Town and Matlock Town before returning to his home town club in Buxton; he later played in Finland for KuPS.

Personal life
He married Christine, and had a son, Matthew.

Career statistics
Source:

Honours
Buxton
Cheshire County League: 1972–73

References

1955 births
2017 deaths
People from Buxton
Footballers from Derbyshire
English footballers
Association football wingers
Reading F.C. players
Buxton F.C. players
Mossley A.F.C. players
Sheffield Wednesday F.C. players
Norwich City F.C. players
Hereford United F.C. players
Port Vale F.C. players
Stafford Rangers F.C. players
Macclesfield Town F.C. players
Matlock Town F.C. players
English expatriate footballers
Expatriate footballers in Finland
Kuopion Palloseura players
English Football League players
Northern Premier League players
National League (English football) players